Yahyalı is a town and the southernmost district of Kayseri province in Turkey. The Aladağlar Mountains, a part of the rocky Taurus Mountains, pass through this region as does the River Zamantı. 

The nearest airport is Kayseri International Airport.

History 
The district was established by Turkish forces led by Seyyid Ali and Yahya Ali (Yahya Gazi who came into Anatolia in the 13th century. The tomb of Seyyid Ali is in the garden of Yahyalı State Hospital while that of Yahya Gazi is in the courtyard of the Yahyalı Grand Mosque (Turkish: Ulu Cami). Yahyalı was affiliated to Kozan until 1926 but became part of Kayseri province after Kozan province became a district in 1926.

Yahyalı Carpets 
The district of Yahyalı is well known for the hand-woven rugs that used to be produced there. These are characterised by their deep red and blue colours and by the medallions usually placed in the centre. Right through into the early 2000s a carpet market clung to life in Yahyalı town.

Çamlıca

Çamlıca was a Greek village of the Yahyalı district also known as Pharasa (Φάρασα), Varasos (Βαρασός), Farasa, Faraşa, or Camlica. Until the Greek-Turkish population exchange of 1923, Notable people from Pharasa included Paisius II of Caesarea, Arsenios the Cappadocian, and Paisios of Mount Athos.

References

 Yahyalı District Governorship 
 Yahyalıca 
 Yahyalı Municipality 

Populated places in Kayseri Province
 
Towns in Turkey